Ronald Levy may refer to:

Ronald Levy (athlete)
Ronald Levy (scientist)